W. J. Little House, also known as the Little House, is a historic home located at Robersonville, Martin County, North Carolina. It was built in 1913–1914, and is a two-story, three-bay, double-pile Classical Revival style frame dwelling.  It has a hipped slate roof topped by a Chippendale-style balustrade, a two-story entrance portico, a one-story wrap-around porch, and a porte-cochère.

It was added to the National Register of Historic Places in 1985.

References

Houses on the National Register of Historic Places in North Carolina
Neoclassical architecture in North Carolina
Houses completed in 1914
Houses in Martin County, North Carolina
National Register of Historic Places in Martin County, North Carolina